This is a list of Martian meteorites i.e. meteorites that have been identified as having originated from Mars.

, 277 meteorites had been classified as Martian, less than half a percent of the 72,000 meteorites that have been classified. On 17 October 2013, NASA reported, based on analysis of argon in the Martian atmosphere by the Mars Curiosity rover, that certain meteorites found on Earth thought to be from Mars, were actually from Mars.  The list does not include meteorites found on Mars by the various rovers.

List

See also

 Glossary of meteoritics
 List of meteorites on Mars
 List of lunar meteorites

Notes
Where multiple meteorites are listed, they are believed to be pieces of the same original body. The mass shown is the total recovered.

Abbreviations:
 Antarctica locations, numbered:
 ALH - Allan Hills
 LAR - Larkman Nunatak
 LEW - Lewis Cliff 
 MIL - Miller Range
 QUE - Queen Alexandra Range
 RBT - Roberts Massif
 YA - Yamato Mountains
 Chassigny - Chassigny, Haute-Marne, France
 Desert locations, numbered:
 DaG - Dar al Gani, Al Jufrah, Libya
 Dhofar - Zufar, Oman
 NWA - Northwest Africa meteorite (mainly Mali, Algeria, Morocco, Mauritania and Western Sahara)
 SaU - Sayh al Uhaymir, Oman
 Nakhla - El Nakhla El Bahariya,  Abu Hummus, Beheira Governorate, Egypt
 Shergotty - Shergotty,  Gaya district, Bihar, India
 Tissint - Tissint, Oued Drâa valley, East of Tata, Morocco

References

External links
 An up-to-date List of Martian Meteorites, Dr. Tony Irving, University of Washington
 Northern Arizona Meteorite Laboratory
 Martian Meteorite News
 Martian Meteorite Compendium JSC, NASA
 Mindat - Martian meteorites

-